Sagiolechia is a genus of lichen-forming fungi in the family Sagiolechiaceae. The genus was circumscribed by lichenologist Abramo Bartolommeo Massalongo in 1854, who assigned Sagiolechia protuberans as the type species. The family Sagiolechiaceae was proposed in 2010 to contain Sagiolechia as the type genus, and genus Rhexophiale; molecular phylogenetic analysis showed that these two genera formed a distinct clade in the Ostropales.

Species
Sagiolechia atlantica  – Madeira
Sagiolechia bairdensis  – Alaska
Sagiolechia monoseptata  – Norway
Sagiolechia parasitica  – Greenland
Sagiolechia phaeospora  – Alaska
Sagiolechia protuberans

References

Ostropales
Lichen genera
Ostropales genera
Taxa described in 1854
Taxa named by Abramo Bartolommeo Massalongo